Dilemma is a genus of marine bivalves of the family Poromyidae. The genus is remarkable for encompassing predators of isopods and ostracods, unusual for sessile molluscs. One species is known from the western Atlantic Ocean (Straits of Florida) and three from across the Pacific. The name of the genus refers to the dilemma that the author of the new genus faced while diagnosing it.

Species
There are four species:
 Dilemma frumarkernorum Leal, 2008
 Dilemma inexpectatum (Crozier, 1966)
 Dilemma japonicum Sasaki & Leal, 2008
 Dilemma spectralis Leal, 2008

References

Poromyidae
Bivalve genera